Holly Hughes (born March 10, 1955) is an American lesbian performance artist.

She began as a feminist painter in New York City but is best known for her connection with the NEA Four, with whom she was denied funding from the National Endowment for the Arts, and for her work with the Women's One World Cafe. Her plays explore sexuality, body images and the female mind. She is the recipient of several awards including the Lambda Book Award and an Obie Award. She is a professor of art and design as well as theater and drama at the University of Michigan School of Art & Design.

Biography 
Born in Saginaw, Michigan, Hughes graduated from Kalamazoo College in 1977 and moved to New York City two years later to become a feminist painter. She worked as a waitress to support herself but felt unfulfilled, later writing: "Why had I moved to New York City to live in an even crummier apartment and do the same things that I was doing in Kalamazoo?"  She saw a poster promoting a "Double X-rated Christmas party" to be held in the basement of a Catholic church.  There she found lesbian women stripping, kissing booths, and a highly sexual atmosphere.  She eagerly attended many such parties, became involved with the group and began doing theater with them because "that's what they were doing".  Hughes' first performance at the Women's One World Cafe (Wow Cafe) in the early 1980s was a piece called "My Life as a Glamour Don't", about various fashion mistakes. She followed this up with "Shrimp in a Basket" and then her breakthrough Well of Horniness (1983).  At the WOW Cafe, Hughes felt that she was able to "tell the stories she so desperately wanted to be told as a child."

Hughes wrote, directed and performed in Dress Suits to Hire (1987).  Critic Stephen Holden commented, in reviewing the play, "While Ms. Hughes's more poetic writing recalls Sam Shepard, the campy B-movie side of her sensibility shows her to be equally in tune with John Waters's movies and Charles Busch's drag extravaganzas."  Focusing on the subjects of sexuality, masturbation and Jesus, her plays usually explore issues that she confronted as a young woman in college.  In 1990 Hughes earned national attention as one of the so-called NEA Four, artists whose funding from the National Endowment for the Arts ("NEA") was vetoed.

In 1996, Hughes released perhaps her most famous and influential performances: Clit Notes.  In this piece, Hughes performs several roles: herself at different ages, her mother, and various lovers that she has had. Hughes uses her writing to explore herself and to understand the events that have shaped her life, often using her writing to escape from elements that she perceives as repressive. In 1998, Hughes co-edited an anthology of queer solo performance with David Roman called O Solo Homo:The New Queer Performance, which included her own Clit Notes. A review by Don Shewey in The Advocate noted the cultural and sexual diversity of contributors.

In February 2017 Hughes organized a D.I.Y. style cabaret-style series of performance events protesting newly elected Donald Trump's presidency entitled "Not My President's Day."   These events which were organized by participants in over sixty cities including Ann Arbor, Brno, Czech Republic, Chicago, Brooklyn, Gateshead, United Kingdom, and San Jose raised funds for organizations such as Planned Parenthood and the A.C.L.U.  She "worked with artists across the globe to build a loose network of over 35 Presidents Day events spanning the U.S., Britain and Italy. Most of the events used some variant on the names "Not My President's Day" or "Bad and Nasty" (derived from President Trump's reference to "bad hombres" and his description of Hillary Clinton as a "nasty woman" during the presidential debates)."

Hughes works as a professor at the University of Michigan School of Art & Design. In 2010, she received a Guggenheim Fellowship.

Bibliography
Well of Horniness (1983)
The Lady Dick (1984)
Dress Suits to Hire (1987)
World Without End (1989)
Clit Notes (1996)
O Solo Homo (1998)
The Dog and Pony Show (bring your own pony) (2010)
Memories of the Revolution: The First Ten Years of the WOW Cafe (2016), with Carmelita Tropicana and Jill Dolan

See also
 NEA Four
 National Endowment for the Arts v. Finley

References

Further reading
Gilson-Ellis, Jools. "New women performance writers; Rose English and Holly Hughes." Journal of Gender Studies 5.2 (1996): 201. Academic Search Complete. EBSCO. Web. 18 Oct. 2011.

American performance artists
American women performance artists
Living people
1955 births
People from Saginaw, Michigan
Artists from Michigan
Kalamazoo College alumni
University of Michigan faculty
Lambda Literary Award for Drama winners
American women dramatists and playwrights
American LGBT dramatists and playwrights
LGBT people from Michigan
American Book Award winners
Sex-positive feminists
American women academics
Lesbian academics
21st-century American women writers
American lesbian artists